Midnight Man is an album by British musician Davey Graham, released in 1966.

Reception

In his Allmusic review, critic Ritchie Unterberger wrote, "Graham went into a somewhat harder-rocking bluesy groove on this record, though a strong jazz feel was always present in the rhythm especially. More than any other Graham LP, this offers proof that the guitarist would have established himself as a major star on the folk circuit in the '60s -- if only his singing was better. As a guitarist, he's simply wonderful, combining folk, jazz, and blues styles into an invigorating, idiosyncratic style that can both swing and attain a delicate sadness. As an interpreter, he's relentlessly imaginative, breathing new vigor into overdone R&B standards, or devising fresh folk arrangements for Beatles and Paul Simon tunes."

Track listing 
 "No Preacher Blues" (Davey Graham) – 2:18
 "The Fakir" (Lalo Schifrin) – 4:15
 "I'm Looking Thru' You" (John Lennon, Paul McCartney) – 2:06
 "Hummingbird" (Davy Graham) – 2:42
 "Watermelon Man" (Herbie Hancock) – 3:02
 "Stormy Monday" (Traditional; arranged by Davey Graham) – 3:41
 "Money Honey" (Jesse Stone) – 2:28
 "Walkin' the Dog" (Rufus Thomas) – 2:41
 "Fire in My Soul" (Blind Willie Johnson) – 1:55
 "Lost Lover Blues" (Traditional; arranged by Davey Graham) – 2:08
 "Neighbour Neighbour" (Jimmy Hughes, Alton Valier) – 2:37
 "Jubilation" (Junior Mance) – 1:49
 "Rags and Old Iron" (Oscar Brown, Jr., King Curtis) – 3:24
 "Jelly Roll Baker" (Lonnie Johnson) – 2:45

Personnel 
 Davey Graham – vocals, guitar
 Tony Reeves - bass on "The Fakir"
 Barry Morgan - drums on "The Fakir"
Technical
 Gus Dudgeon - engineer

References 

1966 albums
Davey Graham albums
Decca Records albums